PEC Aviation, formerly known as PEC Táxi Aéreo is Brazilian air taxi and air ambulance operator based in Santa Genoveva Airport in Goiânia.

History 
Founded in 2004 by aviation and health industry veterans, PEC started its operation with only a Piper Arrow serving daily cargo flights from Macapá to Oiapoque. Due to Brazil's lack of prepared runways and poor jet fuel availability, PEC was the first company to certify the Piper Seneca (and its Embraer equivalents) for Medevac  flights. In 2007, PEC moved its headquarters to Santa Genoveva Airport due to its central position in the country.

Fleet 
PEC operates one Beechcraft King Air C90B, one Cessna Grand Caravan C208B, and one Seneca’s. PEC has the newest turboprop fleet of air taxi operators in the Central-west region.

Leadership 
PEC's founder and current CEO is Captain Milton Arantes Costa, who is known for his advocacy of air taxi, authorized repair shops, and Brazilian aviation in general. Mr. Arantes Costa is the founding president of the Brazilian Association of Air Taxis (ABTAer) and member of ANAC’s Consulting Counsel.

References

External links 
 Company website

Airlines of Brazil